Lough Corry is a lake in Ireland, located on the River Shannon.

Wildlife
Lough Corry is a fishery for brown trout.

See also 
 List of loughs in Ireland

References 

Lakes of County Leitrim
Lakes of County Roscommon